The 1989 FIBA European Championship, commonly called FIBA EuroBasket 1989, was the 26th FIBA EuroBasket regional basketball championship, held by FIBA Europe. It was held in Yugoslavia between 20 and 25 June 1989. Eight national teams entered the event under the auspices of FIBA Europe, the sport's regional governing body. The Dom Sportova in Zagreb was the hosting venue of the tournament. The host, Yugoslavia, won its fourth FIBA European title by defeating the defending champions Greece, with a 98–77 score in the final. Yugoslavia's Dražen Petrović was voted the tournament's MVP. The five best teams in the final standings were given berths to the 1990 FIBA World Championship.

Venues
All games were played at the Dom Sportova in Zagreb.

Qualification

Squads

Format
The teams were split in two groups of four teams each. The top two teams from each group advance to the semifinals. The winners in the knockout semifinals advance to the Final, and the losers figure in a third-place playoff.
The third and fourth teams from each group competed in another bracket to define 5th through 8th place in the final standings.

Preliminary round

Group A
Times given below are in Central European Summer Time (UTC+2).

|}

Group B

|}

Knockout stage

Championship bracket

Semifinals

Third place

Final

5th to 8th place

Awards

Final standings

References

External links
1989 European Championship for Men archive.FIBA.com

1989
1988–89 in European basketball
1988–89 in Yugoslav basketball
1989 in Croatian sport
International basketball competitions hosted by Croatia
International basketball competitions hosted by Yugoslavia
Sports competitions in Zagreb
June 1989 sports events in Europe
1980s in Zagreb